Luigi De La Forest (Paris, 1668 or 1685 - Carpi, Emilia-Romagna, November 1, 1738)  was an Italian-French painter, who was active in Modena.

Biography
Forest moved to Modena around 1712, and painted a Glory of Madonna  and Saints Bonaventure, Bernard of Siena, and Pasquale Baylon altarpiece for the church of Santa Margherita.  From there he moved to Carpi, where he painted works for the church of San Nicolò and the adjacent Convent, including the canvas of Saints Pasquale Baylon and Giovanni della Marca (1719) at a side of the main entrance,  St Francis (1725) for the main altar, and St Onofrio and other saints. La Forest also painted for the churches of S. Giuseppe and S. Sebastiano in Carpi, and the church in the villa di Fossoli. He also painted some genre subjects. He is related to the landscape painter by the name of Giovanni di Pietro Forest (Jean-Baptiste Forest, Paris, 1656–1712) who trained in Milan under Pier Francesco Mola.

References

1738 deaths
17th-century Italian painters
Italian male painters
18th-century Italian painters
French painters
Painters from Modena
Year of birth uncertain
18th-century Italian male artists